Fort Erie is a town on the Niagara River in the Niagara Region, Ontario, Canada. It is directly across the river from Buffalo, New York, and is the site of Old Fort Erie which played a prominent role in the War of 1812.

Fort Erie is one of Niagara's fastest growing communities, and has experienced a high level of residential and commercial development in the past few years. Garrison Road (Niagara Regional Road 3) is the town's commercial corridor, stretching east to west through Fort Erie.

Fort Erie is also home to other commercial core areas (Bridgeburg, Ridgeway, Stevensville and Crystal Beach) as a result of the 1970 amalgamation of Bertie Township and the village of Crystal Beach with Fort Erie.

Crystal Beach Park occupied waterfront land at Crystal Beach, Ontario, from 1888 until the park's closure in 1989. The beach is part of Fort Erie.

History

During the American Revolution Fort Erie was used as a supply depot for British troops. After the war the territory of what is now the Town of Fort Erie was settled by soldiers demobilised from Butler's Rangers, and the area was named Bertie Township in 1784.

The original fort, built in 1764, was located on the Niagara River's edge below the present fort. It served as a supply depot and a port for ships transporting merchandise, troops and passengers via Lake Erie to the Upper Great Lakes. The fort was damaged by winter storms and in 1803, plans were made for a new fort on the higher ground behind the original. It was larger and made of flintstone but was not quite finished at the start of the War of 1812.

During the war, the Americans attacked Fort Erie twice in 1812, captured and abandoned it in 1813, and then recaptured it in 1814. The Americans held it for a time, breaking a prolonged British siege. Later they destroyed Fort Erie and returned to Buffalo in the winter of 1814.

The Fort Erie area became a major terminus for slaves using the Underground Railroad (between 1840 and 1860); many had crossed into Canada from Buffalo, New York. Bertie Hall (which was used for a time in the 20th century as a Doll House Museum) may have been a stopping point on the Underground Railroad. The area of Ridgemount was one of the three main areas in Fort Erie settled by African-Americans, earning it the name "Little Africa". Along with Little Africa, the other two areas of settlement were Bertie Hill and Snake Hill (Erie Beach).

In 1866, during the Fenian raids, between 1,000 and 1,500 Fenians crossed the Niagara River, occupied the town and demanded food and horses. The only payment they were able to offer was Fenian bonds; these were not acceptable to the citizens. The Fenians then cut the telegraph wires and tore up some railway tracks. Afterwards, they marched to Chippewa and the next day to Ridgeway where they fought the Battle of Ridgeway, a series of skirmishes with the Canadian militia. The Fenians then returned to Fort Erie and fought the Battle of Fort Erie, defeating the Canadian militia. Fearing British reinforcements, they then decided to retreat to the U.S.

In 1869 the population was 1,000 and Fort Erie was served by the Grand Trunk and the Erie & Niagara railways. The Grand Trunk Railway built the International Railway Bridge in 1873, bringing about a new town, originally named Victoria and subsequently renamed to Bridgeburg, north of the original settlement of Fort Erie. By 1876, Ridgeway had an estimated population of 800, the village of Fort Erie has an estimated population of 1,200, and Victoria boasted three railway stations. By 1887, Stevensville had an estimated population of "nearly 600", Victoria of "nearly 700", Ridgeway of "about 600", and Fort Erie of "about 4,000".

In 1888, the amusement park at Crystal Beach opened. From 1910, the steamship  (and until 1929, the steamship SS Americana) brought patrons from Buffalo until 1956. The park continued to operate until it closed in 1989. A gated community was built in this area.

In 1904, a group of speculators bought land at Erie Beach, planning to build an amusement park and other amenities, and sell lots around the park to vacationers from Buffalo. Erie Beach featured a hotel, a casino, a race track, regular ferry service from Buffalo and train service from the ferry dock in Fort Erie, and what was billed as the world's largest outdoor swimming pool. Erie Beach and Crystal Beach were in competition to provide bigger thrills to patrons, until Erie Beach went bankrupt during the Depression and closed down on Labour Day weekend, 1930.

The Niagara Movement meeting was held at the Erie Beach Hotel in 1905. The movement later led to the founding of the NAACP.

The Point Abino Light Tower was built by the Canadian government in 1918. The lighthouse has been automated in 1989. Since its decommissioning in 1995, the Point Abino Lighthouse was designated as a National Historic Site. The lighthouse is now owned by the Town of Fort Erie and is available for weekend tours in the summer.

On August 7, 1927, the Peace Bridge was opened between Fort Erie and Buffalo.

On January 1, 1932, Bridgeburg and Fort Erie amalgamated into a single town.

The ruins of Fort Erie remained until they were rebuilt through a depression era "work program" project, as a tourist attraction. Work started in 1937, and the fort was opened to the public in 1939.

In 1970, the provincial government consolidated the various villages in what had been Bertie Township, including the then town of Fort Erie, into the present Town of Fort Erie.

Geography
The soil is shallow, with a clay subsoil.

The town's beaches on Lake Erie, most notably Erie Beach, Crystal Beach and Bay Beach are considered the best in the area and draw many weekend visitors from the Toronto and Buffalo, New York areas. While summers are enjoyable, winters can occasionally be fierce, with many snowstorms, whiteouts and winds coming off Lake Erie.

Communities
In addition to the primary urban core of Fort Erie, the town also contains the neighbourhoods of Black Creek, Bridgeburg/NorthEnd/Victoria, Crescent Park, Crystal Beach, Kraft, Point Abino, Ridgeway, Snyder, and Stevensville.  Smaller and historical neighbourhoods include Amigari Downs, Bay Beach, Buffalo Heights, Douglastown, Edgewood Park, Erie Beach, Garrison Village, Mulgrave, Oakhill Forest, Ridgemount, Ridgewood, Rose Hill Estates, Thunder Bay, Walden, Wavecrest and Waverly Beach.

Fort Erie Secondary School and Ridgeway-Crystal Beach High School were two public high schools serving Fort Erie and area communities until September 2017.  The two former schools were closed and merged into Greater Fort Erie Secondary School, located on Garrison Road.

Climate

Demographics

The median household income in 2015 for Fort Erie was $60,800, which was below the Ontario provincial average of $74,287.

Attractions
 Fort Erie Race Track
 Old Fort Erie
 Point Abino Lighthouse
 Safari Niagara

Hiking
Fort Erie is the eastern terminus of the Friendship Trail, and the southern terminus of the Niagara River Recreation Pathway. Both trails are part of the Trans-Canada Trail system.

Parks
Mather Arch Park, located just to the south of the Peace Bridge, is on land donated by American citizen Alonzo C. Mather in tribute to the peace and friendship between Canada and the United States. The park contains Mather Arch, which was built largely due to donations by Mather, originally dedicated by the Niagara Parks Commission in 1939, and restored in 2000 as a millennium project. There is also a memorial statue to those from Fort Erie who died in World War I, World War II, and the Korean War.

Sports

Infrastructure

Transportation

Highways
Fort Erie has been the Niagara terminus of the Queen Elizabeth Way since 1937. Road traffic continues to Buffalo, New York across the Peace Bridge, which was built in 1927.

Fort Erie was the eastern terminus of King's Highway 3A from 1927 to 1929, and Ontario Highway 3 from 1929 until 1998, when the portion of Highway 3 within Fort Erie was downloaded to the Regional Municipality of Niagara and redesignated as Niagara Regional Road 3. Within Fort Erie, Highway 3 is named Garrison Road, and is the major east–west connection through the town. Dominion Road was designated as King's Highway 3C from 1934 until 1970, when it was downloaded to the newly formed Regional Municipality of Niagara and redesignated as Niagara Regional Road 1.

Fort Erie is the southern terminus of the Niagara Parkway, which extends from Fort Erie to Fort George.

Public transit
Public transit is provided by Fort Erie Transit, which operate buses in town and connecting to other Niagara municipalities.

Niagara Falls Transit operates a service from Niagara Falls into Fort Erie, connecting with the Fort Erie Leisureplex on Garrison Road.

Intercity transit
Private intercity coach services are primarily operated by Coach Canada/Megabus, with service to St. Catharines and Toronto.  The terminus is located at Robo Mart, 21 Princess Street at Waterloo Street.

The International Railway Bridge was built in 1873, and connects Fort Erie to Buffalo, New York across the Niagara River. 

There is currently no passenger rail service to Fort Erie. The nearest passenger rail stations are in Buffalo, New York and Niagara Falls, Ontario.

Waterways
Fort Erie is at the outlet of Lake Erie into the Niagara River. The lake and river serve as a playground for numerous personal yachts, sailboats, power boats and watercraft. There is a marina at the site of a former shipyard at Miller's Creek on the Niagara River, and a boat launch ramp in Crystal Beach.

Prior to the completion of the two bridges, passengers and freight were carried across the river by ferry.

From 1829, when the Welland Canal first opened, to 1833, when the cut was completed to Port Colborne, ship traffic between Lake Erie and Lake Ontario would transit the upper Niagara River.

Utilities
In order to reduce large-scale ice blockage in the Niagara River, with resultant flooding, ice damage to docks and other waterfront structures, and blockage of the water intakes for the hydro-electric power plants at Niagara Falls, the New York Power Authority and Ontario Power Generation have jointly operated the Lake Erie-Niagara River Ice Boom since 1964. The boom is installed on December 16, or when the water temperature reaches , whichever happens first. When in place, the boom stretches  from the outer breakwall at Buffalo Harbor almost to the Canadian shore near the ruins of the pier at Erie Beach in Fort Erie. Originally, the boom was made of wooden timbers, but these have been replaced by steel pontoons.

Notable people
Ernest Alexander Cruikshank, Brigadier General and historian; was born in Bertie Township.
Randy Burridge, played over 700 games in the NHL and was an All-Star in 1992.
Derek Clendening, Canadian writer
Billy Dea, professional hockey player, lived in Crystal Beach with his wife Sally and son Derrick for a large part of his professional career.
Michael Fonfara, keyboard player; was born in Stevensville.
Paul Gardner, professional hockey player; was born in Fort Erie.
Paul Hellyer, engineer and politician.
Douglas Kirkland, photographer.
James L. Kraft, entrepreneur and inventor; was born outside of Stevensville and worked in Fort Erie before emigrating to the United States.
Dan "DJ Shub" General, musician.
Shane Lindstrom (professionally known as Murda Beatz), record producer.
Matty Matheson, chef and internet personality. 
Pierre Pilote, professional hockey player; lived in Fort Erie for most of his adolescence.
David Anthony Pizzuto, actor.
Ron Sider, theologian and social activist; was born in Stevensville.
Nick Weglarz, professional baseball player; was born in Stevensville.

See also
List of townships in Ontario

References

External links

 
Lower-tier municipalities in Ontario
Populated places on Lake Erie in Canada
Populated places on the Underground Railroad
Towns in Ontario
1764 establishments in the British Empire